Meridian High School may refer to:

U.S.
Meridian High School (Idaho), Meridian, Idaho
Meridian Technical Charter High School, Meridian, Idaho
Meridian High School (Macon, Illinois), Macon, Illinois
Meridian High School (Mounds, Illinois), Mounds, Illinois
Perry Meridian High School, Indianapolis, Indiana
Meridian High School (Michigan), Sanford, Midland County, Michigan
Meridian High School (Mississippi), Meridian, Mississippi
Meridian High School (Daykin, Nebraska), Daykin, Nebraska
Cato-Meridian High School, Cato, New York
Meridian High School (Texas), Meridian, Texas
Meridian High School (Virginia), Falls Church, Virginia
Meridian High School (Washington), Bellingham, Washington
Kent-Meridian High School, Kent, Washington

Other countries
Meridian School, a high school in Hyderabad, India
Meridian High School, Croydon, London, England

See also
Meridian (disambiguation)